Bjerringbro station is a railway station serving the railway town of Bjerringbro in Jutland, Denmark.

Bjerringbro station is located on the Langå-Struer Line from Langå to Struer. The station was opened in 1863 with the opening of the Langå-Viborg section of the Langå-Struer Line. It offers direct InterCity services to Copenhagen and Struer as well as regional train services to Aarhus and Struer. The train services are operated by Arriva and DSB.

History 
Bjerringbro station opened on 20 July 1863 with the opening of the Langå-Viborg section of the Langå-Struer railway line. In 1864, the railway line was continued from Viborg to Skive and in 1865 to Struer.

See also
 List of railway stations in Denmark

References

Citations

Bibliography

External links

 Banedanmark – government agency responsible for maintenance and traffic control of most of the Danish railway network
 DSB – largest Danish train operating company
 Arriva – British multinational public transport company operating bus and train services in Denmark
 Danske Jernbaner – website with information on railway history in Denmark

Railway stations opened in 1863
Railway stations in the Central Denmark Region
Railway stations in Denmark opened in the 19th century